Alan John Dix is a British author, researcher, and university professor, specialising in human–computer interaction (HCI). He is one of the four co-authors of the university level textbook Human–Computer Interaction. Dix is the Director of the Computational Foundry at Swansea University, since May 2018. He was previously a professor at Lancaster University.

Publications

Books

Contributions 

 This book contains a chapter written by Dix, in summary from the 1987 British Computer Society of Human-Computer Interaction held at University of Exeter.

References

External links
Alan's homepage
 HCI Book Website
 HCI Course on interaction-design.org

Year of birth missing (living people)
Living people
British computer scientists
Human–computer interaction researchers
Academics of Lancaster University
International Mathematical Olympiad participants